The Naryn Too (or Naryn Range) is a mountain range located in the internal Tien-Shan to the east of Alamyshyk Too between Naryn Valley and At-Bashy Valley. The ridge has sharply rugged glacier relief. Denudation surface is at the elevation of  -  on the north slope of the range's eastern part. In the central part both slopes are highly dissected. There are denudation surfaces on the both slopes in the western part of the range. Foothills are along the south slope. The central and eastern parts of the range are composed of various terrigenous rock, shists, quartzites, limestones, granodiorites, and the western part - by rocks of the middle and late Paleozoic. The northern slopes are covered by spruce forests at elevations of   - , by sub-Alpian meadows and meadow steppes at   - , and by Alpine meadows at   - . High altitude feather-grass steppes (  - ), spruce forests (  - ),  sub-Alpian meadows and meadow steppes, Central Asia juniper (  - ), and glacial-nival belt (above ) are observed at the southern slopes.

References

Mountain ranges of Kyrgyzstan